ZooKeys is a peer-reviewed open access scientific journal covering zoological taxonomy, phylogeny, and biogeography. It was established in 2008 and the editor-in-chief is Terry Erwin (Smithsonian Institution). It is published by Pensoft Publishers.

ZooKeys provides all new taxa to the Encyclopedia of Life on the day of publication.

See also
 Zootaxa

References

External links
 
 
 

Creative Commons Attribution-licensed journals
English-language journals
Open access journals
Publications established in 2008
Zoology journals
Pensoft Publishers academic journals
Continuous journals